Flatbush Avenue was a station on the demolished BMT Fulton Street Line. The Fulton Street Elevated was built by the Kings County Elevated Railway Company and this station started service on April 24, 1888. The station had 2 tracks and 1 island platform. It was served by trains of the BMT Fulton Street Line, and until 1920, trains of the BMT Brighton Line. The station was located west of the BMT Fifth Avenue Line, but had no connection to that elevated line. It was also located north of the Flatbush Avenue station on the Long Island Rail Road, now known as the Atlantic Terminal, and had no connections there either. This station was served by steam locomotives between 1888 and 1899. In 1898, the Brooklyn Rapid Transit Company (BRT) absorbed the Kings County Elevated Railway, and it took over the Fulton Street El, and it was electrified on July 3, 1899.  It closed on June 1, 1940, when all service from Fulton Ferry and Park Row to Rockaway Avenue was abandoned, as it came under city ownership. Current mass transit stations available nearby are either at Nevins Street subway station on the IRT Eastern Parkway Line to the southeast, or at DeKalb Avenue subway station on the BMT Fourth Avenue and Brighton Lines to the northwest.

References

Defunct BMT Fulton Street Line stations
Railway stations in the United States opened in 1888
Railway stations closed in 1940